Sophisticated Funk is an album by organist Jack McDuff recorded in 1976 and released on the Chess label.

Reception
The Allmusic site awarded the album 2 stars stating "This forgettable effort from Jack McDuff veers far too close to smooth jazz territory for comfort -- swapping his signature Hammond B-3 for keyboards, McDuff settles for a fusion sound suggesting a particularly tepid CTI session, with none of the swagger and groove of his most memorable records".

Track listing 
All compositions by Jack McDuff and Billy Jones except as indicated
 "Dit Da Dit" - 6:00  
 "Ju Ju" (Billy Jones) - 6:49  
 "To Be Named Later" - 4:50  
 "Summer Dream" - 4:50  
 "Jack's Boogie" - 3:32  
 "Mini Pads" - 5:50  
 "Electric Surf Board" (Jack McDuff) - 5:17  
 "Mannix Theme" (Lalo Schifrin) - 3:26

Personnel 
Jack McDuff - organ, piano, electric piano
Joe Farrell - saxophones, flute
Brian Cuomo - piano
Robert Banks, Walter Morris - guitar
Billy Jones - guitar, percussion
Frank Prescod - electric bass
Joe Corsello, Ted McKinsey, Clarence Oliver, Arnold Ramsey, Scott Schoer - drums
Craig Derry, Scott Saunders - congas, percussion

References 

Jack McDuff albums
1976 albums
Chess Records albums